Puerto Rico Highway 27 (PR-27)  is a north–south avenue located in San Juan, Puerto Rico, known as Avenida José Celso Barbosa. This highway extends from Avenida 65 de Infantería (PR-3) to Avenida Borinquen (PR-36) in Santurce, east of downtown Río Piedras and Hato Rey.

Major intersections

See also

 List of highways numbered 27

References

External links
 

027
Roads in San Juan, Puerto Rico